Fanny Geefs (1807–1883) was a Belgian painter of Irish descent.

Born Isabelle Marie Françoise Corr in either Dublin or Brussels, she studied art as a child. In the 1830s, she studied with François-Joseph Navez. As well as portraiture, she painted religious and historical scenes such as Our Lady Appearing to the Oppressed, which hangs in the Church of the Holy Family in Schaerbeek. She married successful sculptor Guillaume Geefs in 1836.

She worked on commissions for the Belgian royal family, including several portraits of Queen Louise-Marie. 

Her triptych, La Vie d'Une Femme: La Piété, l'Amour et la Douleur (The Life of a Woman: Pity – Love – Sorrow), was an influence on Charlotte Brontë in her autobiographical novel Villette, set in Brussels. 

On her death in 1883, the Royal Library of Belgium purchased a large collection of her works.

References
  Alexia Creusen, CORR, Fanny (1807–1883, épouse GEEFS, in Éliane Gubin, Catherine Jacques, Valérie Piette & Jean Puissant (eds), Dictionnaire des femmes belges: XIXe et XXe siècles. Bruxelles: Éditions Racine, 2006. 

1807 births
1883 deaths
Belgian people of Irish descent
Belgian women painters
19th-century Belgian women artists
19th-century Belgian painters